Jay State Forest covers  in two tracts in Jay, Richford, Montgomery and Westfield in Franklin and Orleans counties in Vermont. The forest is managed by the Vermont Department of Forests, Parks, and Recreation. 

The forest is divided into two tracts, Black Falls and Big Jay, which features Jay Peak and Jay Peak Resort.

Activities include hiking on the Long Trail and skiing at Jay Peak Resort.

References

External links
Official website

Vermont state forests
Protected areas of Franklin County, Vermont
Protected areas of Orleans County, Vermont
Jay, Vermont
Richford, Vermont
Montgomery, Vermont
Westfield, Vermont